Honora perdubiella is a species of snout moth in the genus Honora. It was described by Harrison Gray Dyar Jr. in 1905. It is found in North America, including Utah, and British Columbia.

References

Further reading

Moths described in 1905
Phycitinae